Starters with Mocktales is a 2012 travel book by Indian author Aditya Krishnan (Hindi: अदित्या क्रिशन्न; born 24 June 1997). The book was released online via Amazon.com on 24 June 2012 as an ebook and subsequently also sold as a paperback. Starters with Mocktales includes 16 travel stories, 3 fictional short stories and 8 literary nonfiction stories.

Krishnan gained international recognition when the ebook was ranked number 1 in multiple sections of the Amazon Kindle store, and reached the Top 800 Bestselling list overall worldwide. With the launch of the book, Krishnan announced that a significant portion of the book's profits would be donated to a charity.

The book is split up into 4 sections: Short Stories, Back in Singapore, Move to Mumbai and Arrive at Singapore. All the titles refer to events in Krishnan's life in reverse chronological order with the exception of Short Stories.

Reception
Starters with Mocktales received high rankings in both its Amazon Kindle page, as well as on the popular book sharing website, Goodreads.

On 3 September 2012, The Hindu, an Indian national newspaper, released their book review on Krishnan's book on their website, and printed the article in the Young World section of The Hindu newspaper on 4 September 2012. The article about Starters with Mocktales, featured an exclusive interview with Krishnan.

The average ranking for the book on Amazon Kindle is 4.8 out of 5 stars, while the average on Goodreads is the maximum 5 out of 5 stars. In Goodreads, the most popular 'shelf' for the book was "to-read".

Contents

Short Stories
Fresh Off the Boat
Feet of Clay
Listening Out of the Box

Back in Singapore
Rolling Hills
NYAA
Super Strings!
Writers’ Fortnight
Community Clean Up
The Funny Guy
The Colours of United Nations Night
The Spirit of Global Concerns Week
BBC Knowledge Challenge

Move to Mumbai
Seas of Sand, Beaches of Knowledge
The European Extravaganza
The News Behind A Newspaper
The City of Gates
Reach Out
Mourning the Death of a Language
Caves of a Single Rock
Carving Basalt
ReConnect's First Expedition

Arrive at Singapore
The Greatest Trip to the Zoo
The Enchanting Colours of Pulau Tioman
Go Dark Green
How I Conquered the Ropes Course
Expressions of Tamen Negara
Tremendous Tokyo

References 

2012 short story collections
Indian non-fiction books
Indian travel books
Indian short story collections